Eoophyla carcassoni is a moth in the family Crambidae. It was described by David John Lawrence Agassiz in 2012. It is found in Kenya.

The wingspan is 15–18 mm. The forewings are whitish, suffused with dark fuscous at the base. There is a pale yellow antemedian fascia and a dark fuscous median fascia. The hindwings are white. Adults have been recorded on wing in June, August and November.

Etymology
The species is named in honour of Robert Herbert Carcasson, who first collected the species.

References

Eoophyla
Moths described in 2012